Vittorio Iannuzzo (born 10 May 1982 in Avellino) is an Italian motorcycle racer. He currently competes in the IDM Superbike Championship aboard a Suzuki GSX-R1000.

He was the 2002 European Superstock 1000 champion riding an Alstare Suzuki.

In his Superbike World Championship participations, he had a front-row start at Misano World Circuit in 2003. In 2010 he had a huge crash at Circuit Ricardo Tormo when he tangled with Simon Andrews. In the same year he rode a factory Triumph Daytona 675 in the Supersport World Championship, having replaced Jason DiSalvo midseason.

Career statistics

Supersport World Championship

Races by year

Superbike World Championship

Races by year

References

External links
 World Superbike Championship profile

1982 births
Living people
People from Avellino
Italian motorcycle racers
Superbike World Championship riders
Supersport World Championship riders
FIM Superstock 1000 Cup riders
British Superbike Championship riders
Sportspeople from the Province of Avellino